Thomas Gardner may refer to:

Thomas Gardner (antiquary) (1690–1769), English antiquary
Thomas Gardner (politician) (1724–1775), American political figure and soldier
Thomas Gardner (planter) (1592–1674), American colonist
Thomas Gardner (basketball) (born 1985), American basketball player
Tommy Gardner (1910–1970), English footballer
Thomas Gardner (footballer, born 1923) (1923–2016), English footballer
Thomas Gardner (soccer) (born 1998), Canadian soccer player
Tom Gardner (born 1968), American businessman, co-founder of The Motley Fool

See also
Thomas Gardiner (disambiguation)
Thomas Garner (disambiguation)
Thomas Gardener (died 1409), politician